White milkwood is a common name for several plants and may refer to:

Sideroxylon inerme, native to South Africa
Tabernaemontana alba, native to the Americas